Live in Paris+ is a live  CD/DVD album by American R&B/soul singer–songwriter/actress Jill Scott, released in the United States on February 5, 2008 by Hidden Beach Recordings. The release was a two-disc set, containing an audio CD and a DVD. Disc one is a live DVD, featuring two concerts, a concert recorded at the Elysee Montmartre in Paris, France during her 2004 Buzz Tour and the "+" in title refers to a live recorded concert in 2007 at House of Blues in Los Angeles, CA. Disc two is Paris+ audio CD of the concert. Live in Paris+ was certified Gold a month after its release.

Track listing

Disc One (DVD)
Live in Paris 2004
"The Way" (J. Scott, Harris) – 8:16
"Whatever" (J. Scott, R. "Pnutt" Frost) - 7:33
"The Fact Is (I Need You)" (Scott, Kuzma) –  7:11
"Golden" (J. Scott, A. Bell) – 13:00
"My Petition" (J. Scott, A. Harris, V. Davis) – 6:01
"Rasool" (J. Scott, A. Harris, Davis, T. Brock, P. Taylor, Barry White) – 8:27
"Bedda At Home" (J. Scott, I. Barias, C. Haggins, F. Romano, J. Smith) – 6:00
"He Loves Me (Lyzel In E Flat)" (J. Scott, Keith Pelzer) – 11:01
Live in Los Angeles 2007
"Crown Royal" (J. Scott, L. Hutson Jr.) – 7:36
"Hate on Me" (J. Scott, A Blackstone, S McKie) – 8:26
"My Love" (J. Scott, A. Blackstone, S. Mckie) – 2:15
"All I" (J. Scott, A. Blackstone) – 9:02

Disc Two (CD)
"The Way" – 8:16
"Whatever" – 7:33
"The Fact Is (I Need You)" – 7:11
"Golden" – 13:00
"My Petition" – 06:01
"Rasool" – 8:27
"Bedda At Home" – 6:00
"He Loves Me (Lyzel In E Flat)" – 11:11

Certifications

References

External links
JillScott.com

2008 live albums
Albums recorded at the House of Blues
Jill Scott (singer) live albums